Goruh or Gorooh or Gorveh may refer to:
Goruh-e Sarhangcheh, Isfahan Province
Goruh, Kerman
Goruh, Razavi Khorasan